{
  "type": "FeatureCollection",
  "features": [
    {
      "type": "Feature",
      "properties": {},
      "geometry": {
        "type": "Point",
        "coordinates": [
          72.97407746315004,
          19.265578693719768
        ]
      }
    }
  ]
}

New Horizon Scholars School is located in Kavesar near Anand Nagar Circle off State Highway 42 (Maharashtra) (commonly referred to as Ghodbunder Road) in Thane (West) in the Mumbai Metropolitan Region of India. It is a branch of the New Horizon Scholars School from the Navi Mumbai suburb Airoli. The school includes a pre-primary education section called Neo Kids. It has classes from Nursery to Grade 12.

The school's Founder President is Dr. Subir Kumar Banerjee. The Chairperson is Ms. Suvra Banerjee. The current principal is Dr. Jyoti Nair
.

History 

The Chairman inaugurated the school on 16 October 2012, and the first academic year commenced in June 2013.

Curriculum 

New Horizon Scholars School strictly follows the curriculum of India's Central Board of Secondary Education (CBSE).

Evaluation 

The school has no exams in lower classes, including primary and pre-primary classes. Instead, it uses Continuous and Comprehensive Evaluation (CCE) for all classes, which consists of 'formative' and 'summative' evaluation.

Activities 

The school offers a blend of scholastic and co-scholastic activities. All activities contribute to the personality development of children with an emphasis on public-speaking skills, music and other arts.

Coaching is offered in chess, dance, aerobics, karate, and skating. Facilities include playgrounds and areas for sports such as football, basketball, volleyball, badminton, cricket and athletics, well-equipped Libraries, and Physics, Chemistry, Biology & IT laboratories.

References

External links 

 

2012 establishments in Maharashtra
Education in Thane
Educational institutions established in 2012
Schools in Thane district

http://cbseaff.nic.in/cbse_aff/schdir_Report/AppViewdir.aspx?affno=1130470